Softcoding is a computer coding term that refers to obtaining a value or function from some external resource, such as text files, INI files, preprocessor macros, external constants, configuration files, command-line arguments, databases, user input, HTTP server responses. It is the opposite of hardcoding, which refers to coding values and functions in the source code.

Programming practice
Avoiding hard-coding of commonly altered values is good programming practice. Users of the software should be able to customize it to their needs, within reason, without having to edit the program's source code. Similarly, careful programmers avoid magic numbers in their code, to improve its readability, and assist maintenance. These practices are generally not referred to as 'softcoding'.

The term is generally used where softcoding becomes an anti-pattern. Abstracting too many values and features can introduce more complexity and maintenance issues than would be experienced with changing the code when required. Softcoding, in this sense, was featured in an article on The Daily WTF.

Potential problems
At the extreme end, soft-coded programs develop their own poorly designed and implemented scripting languages, and  configuration files that require advanced programming skills to edit. This can lead to the production of utilities to assist in configuring the original program, and these utilities often end up being 'softcoded' themselves.

The boundary between proper configurability and problematic soft-coding changes with the style and nature of a program. Closed-source programs must be very configurable, as the end user does not have access to the source to make any changes. In-house software and software with limited distribution can be less configurable, as distributing altered copies is simpler. Custom-built web applications are often best with limited configurability, as altering the scripts is seldom any harder than altering a configuration file. 

To avoid 'softcoding', consider the value to the end user of any additional flexibility you provide, and compare it with the increased complexity and related ongoing maintenance costs the added configurability involves.

Achieving flexibility
Several legitimate design patterns exist for achieving the flexibility that softcoding attempts to provide. An application requiring more flexibility than is appropriate for a configuration file may benefit from the incorporation of a scripting language. In many cases, the appropriate design is a domain-specific language integrated into an established scripting language. Another approach is to move most of an application's functionality into a library, providing an API for writing related applications quickly.

Other meanings
In feature design, softcoding has other meanings.
 Hardcoding: feature is coded to the system not allowing for configuration
 Parametric: feature is configurable via table driven, or properties files with limited parametric values
 Softcoding: feature uses “engines” that derive results based on any number of parametric values (i.e. business rules in BRE); rules are coded but exist as parameters in system, written in script form

See also
 Self-modifying code
 Inner-platform effect
 Rule of least power

References

Computer programming
Anti-patterns